Kings County or King's County may refer to:

Places

Canada
Kings County, New Brunswick
Kings County, Nova Scotia
Kings County, Prince Edward Island
 King's County (electoral district), abolished in 1892

Ireland
 County Offaly, formerly called King's County
 King's County (Parliament of Ireland constituency)
 King's County (UK Parliament constituency)

United States
 Kings County, California
 Kings County, New York, coextensive with Brooklyn
 Washington County, Rhode Island, called King's County until 1781

Ships
 Kings County (barque), a large sailing vessel named after Kings County, Nova Scotia

See also 
 King County (disambiguation)